Emmanuelle in Rio is a 2003 made-for-television erotic film, directed by Kevin Alber and produced by Alain Siritzky from a script by Alber (as Ura Hee).

Synopsis
Erotic adventuress Emmanuelle journeys to Brazil, where, as an internationally renowned fashion photographer, she continues her indiscriminate encounters with a number of denizens of "The Marvelous City".

Cast
 Ludmilla Ferraz (Ludmilla Lloyd) as Emmanuelle
 Hoyt Christopher as Harry
 Simone de Morais as Maria

External links 

American television films
2003 television films
2003 films
Films set in Rio de Janeiro (city)
Emmanuelle
2000s French films